Nicola Strambelli (born 6 September 1988) is an Italian professional footballer. He plays for Casarano.

Club career
In March 2008 he added one more year to his contract with Bari to last until 30 June 2011.

In July 2013 he was acquitted from match-fixing.

On 15 January 2019 he signed a 1.5-year contract with Reggina. On 2 September 2019 his Reggina contract was dissolved by mutual consent.

On 4 October 2019, he signed a one-year contract with Lecco.

On 27 July 2021 he joined Arezzo, freshly relegated to Serie D.

On 18 July 2022, Strambelli moved to Casarano.

References

External links
 

1988 births
Footballers from Bari
Living people
Italian footballers
Association football midfielders
S.S.C. Bari players
A.S.D. Sorrento players
S.S. Fidelis Andria 1928 players
Taranto F.C. 1927 players
A.S. Noicattaro Calcio players
Matera Calcio players
Potenza Calcio players
Reggina 1914 players
Calcio Lecco 1912 players
S.S. Arezzo players
S.S.D. Audace Cerignola players
Serie A players
Serie B players
Serie C players
Serie D players